Redvers is a given name. Notable people with the name include:

Redvers Buller (1839–1908), British army officer
Redvers Kyle (1929–2015), British broadcaster
Redvers Opie (1900–1984), British economist
Redvers Prior (1893–1964), British naval officer and politician
Redvers Sangoe (1936–1964), Welsh boxer
Redvers Smith (1903–?), English professional footballer

See also
Redvers (disambiguation)